Synthia Saint James (born February 11, 1949) is an American visual artist, author, keynote speaker, and educator. She is best known for designing the original cover art of the hardcover edition of Terry McMillan's book Waiting to Exhale. Additionally, Saint James designed the first Kwanzaa stamp for the United States Postal Service, first issued in 1997 and the Kwanzaa Forever Stamp, issued in 2016.

Biography
Synthia Saint James was raised in Los Angeles, California and the Bronx, New York. She sold her first painting in New York City at the age of 20. She currently lives in Los Angeles.

Career
In 1976, Synthia Saint James appeared in the film Emma Mae (also known as Black Sister's Revenge). The film is set in Compton, CA and played the role of Ulika Stansell, cousin to the title-character Emma Mae.

Saint James had her first solo art exhibition in 1977 at the Inner City Cultural Center in Los Angeles, California, where she studied performing arts. In 1980, she participated in her first international exhibition in Paris, France.
 
She received an honorary doctorate (Doctor of Humane Letters) from Saint Augustine's University, Raleigh, North Carolina, on May 8, 2010.

Saint James tours annually to colleges, universities, and other venues to lecture and conduct master classes and workshops.

Bibliography

Children's books

Adult literature

Saint James, Synthia (2015). In and Out of Love: Selected Poetry from the 1970s. Atelier SAINT JAMES. .
Saint James, Synthia (2016). Creative Fixings from the Kitchen: Multicultural Delights. Atelier SAINT JAMES. .
Saint James, Synthia (2016). Honey Suckle Kisses. Atelier SAINT JAMES. .
Saint James, Synthia (2016). I AM EDMONIA LEWIS and I AM WILDFIRE (A Monologue). Atelier SAINT JAMES. .
Saint James, Synthia (2016). Honey Suckle Kisses: Love's Refreshment. Atelier SAINT JAMES. .

Awards

43rd NAACP Image Awards (2012)

"Living My Dream: An Artistic Approach to Marketing": Outstanding Literary Work-Instructional category.

References

External links
Synthia SAINT JAMES Official Web site
Coretta Scott King Book Award Recipients
M.K. Asante, The Black Candle

1949 births
Living people
African-American women artists
American stamp designers
Women stamp designers
American children's book illustrators
American women illustrators
Kwanzaa
Women graphic designers
21st-century African-American people
21st-century African-American women
20th-century African-American people
20th-century African-American women